Argoed railway station served the village of Argoed in the County Borough of Caerphilly, Wales. it succeeded the first Argoed station built by the Sirhowy Tramroad, which operated from 1822 to 1855.

History

The station was opened on 19 June 1865 by the Sirhowy Railway, upon completion of the work to convert the former Sirhowy Tramroad (a plateway of  gauge) into a standard-gauge railway. The company got into financial difficulties, and was leased to the London and North Western Railway in 1875. Therefore, it became part of the London, Midland and Scottish Railway during the Grouping of 1923. It was renamed Argoed Halt on 29 September 1941. Passing on to the Western Region of British Railways on nationalisation in 1948, it was then closed by the British Transport Commission on 13 June 1960.

Notes

References 

 RailBrit: Sirhowy Tramroad
 Station on navigable O.S. map

Disused railway stations in Caerphilly County Borough
Former London and North Western Railway stations
Railway stations in Great Britain opened in 1865
Railway stations in Great Britain closed in 1960
History of Monmouthshire
1865 establishments in Wales
1960 disestablishments in Wales